Sotiris René Sidiropoulos (born in 1977 in Paris) is a French painter and sculptor.

Biography 
His father, iconographe, sculptor, Doctor of philosophy and former student of Philopoemen Constantinidi
or Caracosta and Costas Valsamis, inculcates to him the rudiments of the profession of iconographe and sculptor.

Their first family workshop of iconography and sculpture was created in 1848 in Cappadocia.

In his youth, he was the student of the painters Philopoemen Constantinidi and Zoe Valsamis.

He was the student also of the sculptor Costas Valsamis, (alumnus of Ossip Zadkine).
He studied the works of Pablo Picasso which are an inexhaustible source of artistic inspiration.
He studied at the Academie de la Grande Chaumière in Paris.

Creations 
Icons for the City of the Vatican.
Portrait of Pope Benedict XVI, Vatican City, Rome, Italy.
Portrait of the Queen Sophie of Spain, Palace of Zarzuela, Madrid, Spain.
Portrait of the Queen Silvia of Sweden, Royal Palace in Stockholm, Sweden.
Portrait of the Crown Princess Victoria of Sweden, Royal Palace in Stockholm, Sweden.
Posthumous portrait of Sir Winston Churchill, Canadian War Museum, Ottawa, Canada.
Painting of the Cuban and her child, Museo Nacional de Bellas Artes de La Habana, Cuba.
Portrait of Charlotte Casiraghi of Monaco, Villa Paloma, New National Museum of Monaco, Principality of Monaco.
Portrait of the Josephine-Charlotte, Grand Duchess of Luxembourg, Museum of Modern Art Grand-Duc Jean, Luxembourg.

References 

Dictionnaire de Cotation des Artistes 2009 du XVe siècle à nos jours, Larousse Diffusion, Les Éditions REMMAX, page 559, .
Dictionnaire de Cotation des Artistes 2010 du XVe siècle à nos jours, Larousse Diffusion, Édité par la sarl Guid'Arts, .
Martine Brimault, Peintres de Portraits à Paris de 1764 à 2014, Erato 2014, page 135, 136, 137, 138, 139, BNF Bibliothèque Nationale de France, Paris, France. BNF Catalogue Général
Martine Brimault, Sotiris René Sidiropoulos, Peintre Sculpteur, monographie de l'artiste, Erato 2014, BNF Bibliothèque Nationale de France, Paris, France. BNF Catalogue Général
Poem for the artist written by the poet Gaston Berry in the collection of poems, Les Carillons du Soir, page 47.

External links 
DEN STORE DANSKE Gyldendals åbne Encyklopædi, Copenhagen, Denmark.
Enciclopèdia Catalana, Barcelona, Spain.

20th-century French painters
20th-century French male artists
French male painters
21st-century French painters
Alumni of the Académie de la Grande Chaumière
Living people
1977 births
Painters from Paris
20th-century French sculptors
French male sculptors
French people of Greek descent